A zine (short for magazine or fanzine) is a small-circulation self-published work of original or appropriated texts and images, usually reproduced via a copy machine. Zines are the product of either a single person or of a very small group, and are popularly photocopied into physical prints for circulation. A fanzine (blend of fan and magazine) is a non-professional and non-official publication produced by enthusiasts of a particular cultural phenomenon (such as a literary or musical genre) for the pleasure of others who share their interest. The term was coined in an October 1940 science fiction fanzine by Russ Chauvenet and popularized within science fiction fandom, entering the Oxford English Dictionary in 1949.

Popularly defined within a circulation of 1,000 or fewer copies, in practice many zines are produced in editions of fewer than 100. Among the various intentions for creation and publication are developing one's identity, sharing a niche skill or art, or developing a story, as opposed to seeking profit. Zines have served as a significant medium of communication in various subcultures, and frequently draw inspiration from a "do-it-yourself" philosophy that disregards the traditional conventions of professional design and publishing houses, proposing an alternative, confident, and self-aware contribution. Handwritten zines, or carbon zines, are individually made, emphasizing a personal connection between creator and reader, turning imagined communities into embodied ones.

Historically, zines have provided community for socially isolated individuals or groups through the ability to express and pursue common ideas and subjects. For this reason, zines have cultural and academic value as tangible traces of marginal communities, many of which are otherwise little-documented. Zines present groups that have been dismissed with an opportunity to voice their opinion, both with other members of their own communities or with a larger audience. This has been reflected in the creation of zine archives and related programming in such mainstream institutions as the Tate museum and the British Library.

Written in a variety of formats from desktop-published text to comics, collages and stories, zines cover broad topics including fanfiction, politics, poetry, art & design, ephemera, personal journals, social theory, intersectional feminism, single-topic obsession, or sexual content far outside the mainstream enough to be prohibitive of inclusion in more traditional media. (An example of the latter is Boyd McDonald's Straight to Hell, which reached a circulation of 20,000.) Although there are a few eras associated with zine-making, this "wave" narrative proposes a limited view of the vast range of topics, styles and environments zines occupied.

History

Overview and origins 
Dissidents, under-represented, and marginalized groups have published their own opinions in leaflet and pamphlet form for as long as such technology has been available. The concept of zines can be traced to the amateur press movement of the late 19th and early 20th century, which would in turn intersect with Black literary magazines during the Harlem Renaissance, and the subculture of science fiction fandom in the 1930s. The popular graphic-style associated with zines is influenced artistically and politically by the subcultures of Dada, Fluxus, Surrealism, and Situationism.

Many trace zines' lineage from as far back as Thomas Paine's exceptionally popular 1775 pamphlet Common Sense, Benjamin Franklin's literary magazine for psychiatric patients at a Pennsylvania hospital and The Dial (1840–44) by Margaret Fuller and Ralph Waldo Emerson.

Zines were given a pop culture revival in March 2021 with the release of the Amy Poehler-directed film Moxie, released by Netflix, about a 16-year old high school student who starts a feminist zine to empower the young women at her school.

1920s

Little Magazines during the Harlem Renaissance 
In the 1920s, a group of Black creatives in Harlem began a literary magazine "the better to express ourselves freely and independently – without interference from old heads, white or Negro." This led to the creation of a "little magazine" entitled Fire!!. Only one issue of Fire!! was released, but this inspired the creation of other "little magazines" by Black authors. Contributions by Black writers, artists, and activists to the zine movement are often overlooked, in part "because they had such short runs and were spearheaded by a single or small group of individuals."

1930s–1960s and science fiction 

During and after the Great Depression, editors of "pulp" science fiction magazines became increasingly frustrated with letters detailing the impossibilities of their science fiction stories. Over time they began to publish these overly-scrutinizing letters, complete with their return addresses. Hugo Gernsback published the first science fiction magazine, Amazing Stories in 1926, and allowed for a large letter column which printed reader's addresses. By 1927 readers, often young adults, would write to each other, bypassing the magazine. Now complete with a mailing list for their own science fiction fanzines, fans began writing to each other not only about science fiction but about fandom itself. This also led to perzines, zines about themselves. Science fiction fanzines vary in content, from short stories to convention reports to fanfiction were one of the earliest incarnations of the zine and influenced subsequent publications. "Zinesters" like Lisa Ben and Jim Kepner honed their talents in the science fiction fandom before tackling gay rights, creating zines such as "Vice Versa" and "ONE" that drew networking and distribution ideas from their science fiction roots. A number of leading science fiction and fantasy authors rose through the ranks of fandom, creating "pro-zines" such as Frederik Pohl and Isaac Asimov. The first science fiction fanzine, The Comet, was published in 1930 by the Science Correspondence Club in Chicago and edited by Raymond A. Palmer and Walter Dennis. The first version of Superman (a bald-headed villain) appeared in the third issue of Jerry Siegel and Joe Shuster's 1933 fanzine Science Fiction.

Star Trek 
The first media fanzine was a Star Trek fan publication called Spockanalia, published in September 1967 by members of the Lunarians. Some of the earliest examples of academic fandom were written on Star Trek zines, specifically K/S (Kirk/Spock) slash zines, which featured a gay relationship between the two. Author Joanna Russ wrote in her 1985 analysis of K/S zines that slash fandom at the time consisted of around 500 core fans and was 100% female. "K/S not only speaks to my condition. It is written in Female. I don't mean that literally, of course. What I mean is that I can read it without translating it from the consensual, public world, which is sexist, and unconcerned with women per se, and managing to make it make sense to me and my condition."
Russ observed that while science fiction fans looked down on Star Trek fans, Star Trek fans looked down on K/S writers. Kirk/Spock zines contained fanfiction, artwork, and poetry created by fans. Zines were then sent to fans on a mailing list or sold at conventions. Many had high production values and some were sold at convention auctions for hundreds of dollars.

Janus and Aurora 
Janus, later called Aurora, was a science fiction feminist zine created by Janice Bogstad and Jeanne Gomoll in 1975. It contained short stories, essays, and film reviews. Among its contributors were authors such as Octavia Butler, Joanna Russ, Samuel R. Delany, and Suzette Hayden Elgin. Janus/Aurora was nominated for the Hugo Award for "Best Fanzine" in 1978, 1979, and 1980. Janus/Aurora was the most prominent science fiction feminist zine during its run, as well as one of the only zines that dealt with such content.

Comics 
Comics were mentioned and discussed as early as the late 1930s in the fanzines of science fiction fandom. They often included fan artwork based on existing characters as well as discussion of the history of comics. Through the 1960s, and 1970s, comic fanzines followed general formats, such as the industry news and information magazine (The Comic Reader was one example), interview, history and review-based fanzines, and the fanzines which basically represented independent comic book-format exercises.

In 1936, David Kyle published  The Fantasy World , possibly the first comics fanzine.

Malcolm Willits and Jim Bradley started The Comic Collector's News in October 1947. In 1953, Bhob Stewart published The EC Fan Bulletin, which launched EC fandom of imitative Entertaining Comic fanzines. Among the wave of EC fanzines that followed, the best-known was Ron Parker's Hoo-Hah! In 1960, Richard and Pat Lupoff launched their science fiction and comics fanzine Xero and in 1961, Jerry Bails' Alter Ego, devoted to costumed heroes, became a focal point for superhero comics fandom.

Horror 
Calvin T. Beck's Journal of Frankenstein (later Castle of Frankenstein) and Gary Svehla's Gore Creatures were the first horror fanzines created as more serious alternatives to the popular Forrest J Ackerman 1958 magazine Famous Monsters of Filmland. Garden Ghouls Gazette – a 1960s horror title under the editorship of Dave Keil, then Gary Collins—was later headed by Frederick S. Clarke and in 1967 became the respected journal Cinefantastique. It later became a prozine under journalist-screenwriter Mark A. Altman and has continued as a webzine. Richard Klemensen's Little Shoppe of Horrors, having a particular focus on "Hammer Horrors," began in 1972 and is still publishing as of 2017. The Baltimore-based Black Oracle (1969–1978) from writer-turned-John Waters repertory member George Stover was a diminutive zine that evolved into the larger-format Cinemacabre. Stover's Black Oracle partner Bill George published his own short-lived zine The Late Show (1974–1976; with co-editor Martin Falck), and later became editor of the Cinefantastique prozine spinoff Femme Fatales. In the mid-1970s, North Carolina teenager Sam Irvin published the horror/science-fiction fanzine Bizarre which included his original interviews with UK actors and filmmakers; Irvin would later become a producer-director in his own right. Japanese Fantasy Film Journal (JFFJ) (1968–1983) from Greg Shoemaker covered Toho's Godzilla and his Asian brethren. Japanese Giants (JG) appeared in 1974 and was published for 30 years. In 1993, G-FAN was published, and reached its 100th regularly published issue in Fall 2012. FXRH (Special effects by Ray Harryhausen) (1971–1976) was a specialized zine co-created by future Hollywood FX artist Ernest D. Farino.

Rock and roll 
Several fans active in science fiction and comics fandom recognized a shared interest in rock music, and the rock fanzine was born. Paul Williams and Greg Shaw were two such science fiction fans turned rock zine editors. Williams' Crawdaddy! (1966) and Shaw's two California-based zines, Mojo Navigator Rock and Roll News (1966) and Who Put the Bomp (1970), are among the most popular early rock fanzines.

Crawdaddy! (1966) quickly moved from its fanzine roots to become one of the first rock music "prozines" with paid advertisers and newsstand distribution. Bomp remained a fanzine, featuring many writers who would later become prominent music journalists, including Lester Bangs, Greil Marcus, Ken Barnes, Ed Ward, Dave Marsh, Mike Saunders and R. Meltzer as well as cover art by Jay Kinney and Bill Rotsler (both veterans of science fiction and Comics fandom). Other rock fanzines of this period include denim delinquent (1971) edited by Jymn Parrett, Flash (1972) edited by Mark Shipper, Eurock Magazine (1973–1993) edited by Archie Patterson and Bam Balam written and published by Brian Hogg in East Lothian, Scotland, (1974).

In the 1980s, with the rise of stadium superstars, many home-grown rock fanzines emerged. At the peak of Bruce Springsteen's megastardom following the Born in the U.S.A. album and Born in the U.S.A. Tour in the mid-1980s, there were no less than five Springsteen fanzines circulating at the same time in the UK alone, and many others elsewhere. Gary Desmond's Candy's Room, coming from Liverpool, was the first in 1980. This was quickly followed by Dan French's Point Blank, Dave Percival's The Fever, Jeff Matthews' Rendezvous, and Paul Limbrick's Jackson Cage. In the US, Backstreets Magazine started in Seattle in 1980 and still continues today as a glossy publication, now in communication with Springsteen's management and official website. Crème Brûlée documented post-rock genre and experimental music (1990s).

1970s and punk 
Punk zines emerged as part of the punk subculture in the late 1970s, along with the increasing accessibility to copy machines, publishing software, and home printing technologies. Punk became a genre for the working class because of the economic necessity to use creative DIY methods, which were echoed in both zine and Punk music creation. Zines became vital to the popularization and spread of punk spreading to countries outside the UK and America, such as Ireland, Indonesia, and more by 1977. Amateur, fan-created zines played an important role in spreading information about different scenes (city or regional-based subcultures) and bands (e.g. British fanzines like Mark Perry's Sniffin Glue and Shane MacGowan's Bondage) in the pre-Internet era. They typically included reviews of shows and records, interviews with bands, letters, and ads for records and labels.

The punk subculture in the United Kingdom spearheaded a surge of interest in fanzines as a countercultural alternative to established print media. The first and still best known UK 'punk zine' was Sniffin' Glue, produced by Deptford punk fan Mark Perry which ran for 12 photocopied issues; the first issue produced by Perry immediately following (and in response to) the London debut of The Ramones on 4 July 1976. Other UK fanzines included Blam!, Bombsite, Burnt Offering, Chainsaw, New Crimes, Vague, Jamming, Artcore Fanzine, Love and Molotov Cocktails, To Hell With Poverty, New Youth, Peroxide, ENZK, Juniper beri-beri, No Cure,Communication Blur, Rox, Grim Humour, Spuno, Cool Notes and Fumes. By 1990, Maximum Rocknroll "had become the de facto bible of the scene, presenting a "passionate yet dogmatic view" of what hardcore was supposed to be." HeartattaCk and Profane Existence took the DIY lifestyle to a religious level for emo and post-hardcore and crust punk culture. Slug and Lettuce started at the state college of PA and became an international 10,000 copy production – all for free. In Canada, the zine Standard Issue chronicles the Ottawa hardcore scene. The Bay Area zine Cometbus was first created at Berkeley by the zinester and musician Aaron Cometbus. Gearhead Nation was a monthly punk freesheet that lasted from the early 1990s to 1997 in Dublin, Ireland. Some hardcore punk zines became available online such as the e-zine chronicling the Australian hardcore scene, RestAssured. In Italy, Mazquerade ran from 1979 to 1981 and Raw Art Fanzine ran from 1995 to 2000.

In the US, Flipside (created by Al Kowalewski, Pooch (Patrick DiPuccio), Larry Lash (Steven Shoemaker), Tory, X-8 (Sam Diaz)) and Slash (created by Steve Samioff and Claude Bessy) were important punk zines for the Los Angeles scene, both debuting in 1977. In 1977 in Australia, Bruce Milne and Clinton Walker fused their respective punk zines Plastered Press and Suicide Alley to launch Pulp; Milne later went on to invent the cassette zine with Fast Forward, in 1980. In the American Midwest, a zine called Touch and Go described the area's hardcore scene from 1979 to 1983. We Got Power described the LA scene from 1981 to 1984, and included show reviews and band interviews with groups including DOA, the Misfits, Black Flag, Suicidal Tendencies, and the Circle Jerks. My Rules was a photo zine that included photos of hardcore shows from across the US an in Effect, launched in 1988 described the New York City punk scene. Among later titles, Maximum RocknRoll is a major punk zine, with over 300 issues published. As a result, in part, of the popular and commercial resurgence of punk in the late 1980s, and after, with the growing popularity of such bands as Sonic Youth, Nirvana, Fugazi, Bikini Kill, Green Day and The Offspring, a number of other punk zines have appeared, such as Dagger, Profane Existence, Punk Planet, Razorcake, Slug and Lettuce, Sobriquet and Tail Spins. The early American punk zine Search and Destroy eventually became the influential fringe-cultural magazine Re/Search.

"In the post-punk era several well-written fanzines emerged that cast an almost academic look at earlier, neglected musical forms, including Mike Stax' Ugly Things, Billy Miller and Miriam Linna's Kicks, Jake Austen's Roctober, Kim Cooper's Scram, P. Edwin Letcher's Garage & Beat, and the UK's Shindig! and Italy's Misty Lane." Mark Wilkins, the promotion director for 1982 onwards US punk/thrash label Mystic Records, had over 450 US fanzines and 150 foreign fanzines he promoted to regularly. He and Mystic Records owner Doug Moody edited The Mystic News Newsletter which was published quarterly and went into every promo package to fanzines. Wilkins also published the highly successful Los Angeles punk humor zine Wild Times and when he ran out of funding for the zine syndicated some of the humorous material to over 100 US fanzines under the name of Mystic Mark.

Factsheet Five 
During the 1980s and onwards, Factsheet Five (the name came from a short story by John Brunner), originally published by Mike Gunderloy and now defunct, catalogued and reviewed any zine or small press creation sent to it, along with their mailing addresses. In doing so, it formed a networking point for zine creators and readers (usually the same people). The concept of zine as an art form distinct from fanzine, and of the "zinesters" as member of their own subculture, had emerged. Zines of this era ranged from perzines of all varieties to those that covered an assortment of different and obscure topics. Genres reviewed by Factsheet Five included quirky, medley, fringe, music, punk, grrrlz, personal, science fiction, food, humour, spirituality, politics, queer, arts & letters, comix.

1990s and riot grrrl 
The riot grrrl movement emerged from the DIY Punk subculture in tandem with the American era of third-wave feminism, and used the consciousness-raising method of organizing and communication. As feminist documents, they follow a longer legacy of feminist and women's self-publication that includes scrapbooking, periodicals and health publications, allowing women to circulate ideas that would not otherwise be published. The American publication Bikini Kill (1990) introduced the Riot Grrrl Manifesto in their second issue as a way of establishing space. Zinesters Erika Reinstein and May Summer founded the Riot Grrrl Press to serve as a zine distribution network that would allow riot grrrls to "express themselves and reach large audiences without having to rely on the mainstream press".

Girls use this grassroots medium to discuss their personal lived experiences, and themes including body image, sexuality, gender norms, and violence to express anger, and reclaim/refigure femininity. Scholar and zinester Mimi Thi Nguyen notes that these norms unequally burdened riot grrrls of color with allowing white riot grrrls access to their personal experiences, an act which in itself was supposed to address systemic racism.

BUST - "The voice of the new world order" was created by Debbie Stoller, Laurie Hanzel and Marcelle Karp in 1993 to propose an alternate to the popular mainstream magazines Cosmopolitan and Glamour. Additional zines following this path are Shocking Pink (1981–82, 1987–92), Jigsaw (1988– ), Not Your Bitch 1989-1992 (Gypsy X, ed.) Bikini Kill (1990), Girl Germs (1990), Bamboo Girl (1995– ), BITCH Magazine (1996– ), Hip Mama (1997– ), Kitten Scratches (1999) and ROCKRGRL (1995–2005).

In the mid-1990s, zines were also published on the Internet as e-zines. Websites such as Gurl.com and ChickClick were created out of dissatisfaction of media available to women and parodied content found in mainstream teen and women's magazines. Both Gurl.com and ChickClick had a message board and free web hosting services, where users could also create and contribute their own content, which in turn created a reciprocal relationship where women could also be seen as creators rather than consumers.

Commercialization 
Starting in this decade, multinational companies started appropriating and commodifying zines and DIY culture. Their faux zines created a commercialized hipster lifestyle. By late in the decade, independent zinesters were accused of "selling out" to make a profit.

Distribution and circulation 
Zines are sold, traded or given as gifts at symposiums, publishing fairs, record and book stores and concerts, via independent media outlets, zine 'distros', mail order or through direct correspondence with the author. They are also sold online on distro websites, Etsy shops, blogs, or social networking profiles and are available for download. While zines are generally self-published, there are a few independent publishers who specialize in art zines such as Nieves Books in Zurich, founded by Benjamin Sommerhalder, and Café Royal Books founded by Craig Atkinson in 2005. In recent years a number of photocopied zines have risen to prominence or professional status and have found wide bookstore and online distribution. Notable among these are Giant Robot, Dazed & Confused, Bust, Bitch, Cometbus, Doris, Brainscan, The Miscreant, and Maximum RocknRoll.

Live map of zine distributors worldwide

There are many catalogued and online based mail-order distros for zines. The longest running distribution operation is Microcosm Publishing in Portland, Oregon. Some other longstanding operations include Great Worm Express Distribution in Toronto, CornDog Publishing in Ipswich in the UK, Café Royal Books in Southport in the UK, AK Press in Oakland, California, Missing Link Records in Melbourne. and Wasted Ink Zine Distro in Phoenix, AZ.

Libraries and archives 
A number of major public and academic libraries and museums carry zines and other small press publications, often with a specific focus (e.g. women's studies) or those that are relevant to a local region.

Libraries and institutions with notable zine collections include:

 Barnard College Library 
 The University of Iowa Special Collections
 The Sallie Bingham Center for Women's History and Culture at Duke University 
 The Tate Museum
 The British Library
 Harvard University's Schlesinger Library
 Los Angeles Public Library
 San Francisco Public Library
 Jacksonville Public Library

The Indie Photobook Library, an independent archive in the Washington, D.C., area, is a large collection of photobooks and photo zines dating from 2008 to 2016 which the Beinecke Rare Book and Manuscript Library at Yale University acquired in 2016. In California, the Long Beach Public Library began to be the first public library in the state to start circulating zines for three weeks at a time in 2015. In 2017 the Los Angeles Public Library started to circulate zines publicly to its patrons as well. Both projects have been credited to librarian Ziba Zehdar who has been an advocate in promoting circulating zines publicly at libraries in California.

It has been suggested that the adoption of zine culture by powerful and prestigious institutions contradicts their function as declarations of agency by marginalized groups.

Zine fests, workshops, and clubs 

There has been a resurgence in the alternative publication culture beginning in the 2010s, in tandem with the influx of zine libraries and as a result of the digital age, which has sparked zine festivals across the globe. The San Francisco Zine Fest started in 2001 and features up to 200+ exhibitors, while the Los Angeles Zine Fest started in 2012 with only a handful of exhibitors, now hosting over 200 exhibitors.These are considered to be some of the biggest zine fests in the United States, Other big zine fests across the globe include, San Francisco Zine Fest, Brooklyn Zine Fest, Chicago Zine Fest, Feminist Zine Fest, Amsterdam Zine Jam, and Sticky Zine Fair. At each zine fest, the zinester can be their own independent distributor and publisher simply by standing behind a table to sell or barter their work. Over time, zinesters have added posters, stickers, buttons and patches to these events. In many libraries, schools and community centers around the world, zinesters hold meetings to create, share, and pass down the art of making zines.

2000s and the effect of the Internet 
With the rise of the Internet in the mid-1990s, zines initially faded from public awareness possibly due to the ability of private web-pages to fulfill much the same role of personal expression. Indeed, many zines were transformed into Webzines, such as Boing Boing or monochrom. The metadata standard for cataloging zines is xZineCorex, which maps to Dublin Core. E-zine creators were originally referred to as "adopters" because of their use of pre-made type and layouts, making the process less ambiguous. Since, social media, blogging and vlogging have adopted a similar do-it-yourself publication model.

In the UK Fracture and Reason To Believe were significant fanzines in the early 2000s, both ending in late 2003. Rancid News filled the gap left by these two zines for a short while. On its tenth issue Rancid News changed its name to Last Hours with 7 issues published under this title before going on hiatus. Last Hours still operates as a webzine though with more focus on the anti-authoritarian movement than its original title. Artcore Fanzine (established in 1986) continues to this day, recently publishing a number of 30-year anniversary issues.

Mira Bellwether's zine Fucking Trans Women, published in 2010 online and 2013 in print, proved influential in the field of transgender sexuality, receiving both scholarly and popular-culture attention. It was described in Sexuality & Culture as "a comprehensive guide to trans women's sexuality" and The Mary Sue as "the gold standard in transfeminine sex and masturbation".

alt.zines 
The Usenet newsgroup alt.zines was created in 1992 by Jerod Pore and Edward Vielmetti for the discussion of zines and zine-related topics.

Television shows 
Two popular kids shows in the late 1990s and early 2000s featured zine-making: Our Hero (2000–02) and Rocket Power (1999–2004). The main character in Our Hero, Kale Stiglic, writes about her life in the Toronto suburbs. The episodes are narrated and presented in the form of zine issues that she creates, inheriting her father's storytelling passion. The show won titles from the Canadian Comedy Awards and Gemini Awards during its development.

See also

 Artist's book
 Broken Pencil (with zine reviews)
 Chapbook
 Copybook
 Doujinshi
 Ezine
 Hugo Award for Best Fanzine
 Information activist
 List of minicomics creators
 Minicomic
 Pamphlet
 Pop-up book
 Samizdat
 Underground comix
 United Fanzine Organization

References

Further reading

 Anderberg, Kirsten. Alternative Economies, Underground Communities: A First Hand Account of Barter Fairs, Food Co-ops, Community Clinics, Social Protests and Underground Cultures in the Pacific Northwest & CA 1978–2012. USA: 2012.
 Anderberg, Kirsten. Zine Culture: Brilliance Under the Radar. Seattle, USA: 2005.
 Bartel, Julie. From A to Zine: Building a Winning Zine Collection in Your Library. American Library Association, 2004.
 Biel, Joe $100 & a T-shirt: A Documentary About Zines in the Northwest. Microcosm Publishing, 2004, 2005, 2008 (Video)
 Biel, Joe Make a Zine: Start Your Own Underground Publishing Revolution (20th anniversary 3rd edn) Microcosm Publishing, 1997, 2008, 2017 
 Block, Francesca Lia and Hillary Carlip. Zine Scene: The Do It Yourself Guide to Zines. Girl Press, 1998.
 Brent, Bill. Make a Zine!. Black Books, 1997 (1st edn.), . Microcosm Publishing, with Biel, Joe, 2008 (2nd edn.), .
 Brown, Tim W. Walking Man, A Novel. Bronx River Press, 2008. .
 Duncombe, Stephen. Notes from Underground: Zines and the Politics of Alternative Culture. Microcosm Publishing, 1997, 2008, 2017. .
 Kennedy, Pagan. Zine: How I Spent Six Years of My Life in the Underground and Finally...Found Myself...I Think (1995) .
 Klanten, Robert, Adeline Mollard, Matthias Hübner, and Sonja Commentz, eds. Behind the Zines: Self-Publishing Culture. Berlin: Die Gestalten Verlag, 2011. 
 Piepmeier, Alison . Girl Zines: Making Media, Doing Feminism. NYU Press. (2009) .
 Spencer, Amy. DIY: The Rise of Lo-Fi Culture. Marion Boyars Publishers, Ltd., 2005.
 Watson, Esther and Todd, Mark. "Watcha Mean, What's a Zine?" Graphia, 2006. .
 Vale, V. Zines! Volume 1 (RE/Search, 1996) .
 Vale, V. Zines! Volume 2 (RE/Search, 1996) .
 Wrekk, Alex. Stolen Sharpie Revolution. Portland: Microcosm Publishing, 2003. .
 Richard Hugo House Zine Archives and Publishing Project (ZAPP). "ZAPP Seattle". Seattle, USA.
 "The Ragged Edge Collection," Skateboarding, Music, and Art Zines from the ‘1980s and’1990s. Internet Archive

DIY culture
Publications by format
Subcultures
 
Publishing
Underground culture